WANM (90.5 FM) is an American radio station broadcasting a college radio (urban contemporary) format. Licensed to Tallahassee, Florida, the station serves the greater Tallahassee area. The radio station is owned by Florida A&M University and had the call sign WAMF until 1999. WANM was formerly an AM station at 1070 AM. The frequency is currently used by WFRF (AM).

External links
WANM official website

ANM
Wanm
Radio stations established in 1989
Urban contemporary radio stations in the United States
African-American radio
ANM
1989 establishments in Florida